Farm to Market Road 1776 (FM 1776) is a Farm to Market Road in the U.S. state of Texas maintained by the Texas Department of Transportation (TxDOT). The  road begins at a junction with Interstate 10 (I-10) and U.S. Highway 67 (US 67) in Pecos County west of Fort Stockton and extends northward through the town of Coyanosa before ending at State Highway 18 (SH 18) in Ward County south of Monahans. The road has an interchange with  US 285 northeast of Fort Stockton.

Before the road was established, TxDOT had previously assigned the road's numerical designation to two other roads in eastern Texas.

Route description
FM 1776 begins at I-10 Exit 248 as a northward extension of the US 67 roadway which approaches from the southwest from Alpine and merges with I-10. The two-lane road continues to the north beneath the US 285 underpass and reaches Coyanosa. The road then leaves Pecos County at the Pecos River and crosses into Ward County where it intersects  FM 1927 south of Pyote.

History

FM 1776 was originally designated northward along a former alignment of  US 96 between  SH 184 at Bronson in Sabine County and SH 21 at Ford's Corner in San Augustine County on September 19, 1951. The former  road became an extension of FM 1 on October 14, 1954.

FM 1776 was briefly designated on February 17, 1955 along a Grimes County route from  FM 149 in Richards southeastward toward Dacus to the Montgomery County line. The designation of the  route did not survive the year before being combined with FM 1486 on November 2 of that year.

The current route was designated on February 24, 1956 between FM 1450 and SH 18. The road was extended southward through Coyanosa to US 67 and  US 290, the predecessor route to I-10 in much of western Texas, on May 6, 1964.

Construction began on the US 285 interchange in 2011 and was completed the following year. The interchange was funded through a 2009 safety bond program due to a history of fatal accidents.

Major intersections

See also

References

External links

Coyanosa, TX from The Handbook of Texas Online

1776
Transportation in Pecos County, Texas
Transportation in Ward County, Texas